Christine Ida Collins (December 14, 1888 – December 8, 1964) was an American woman who made national headlines during the late 1920s and 1930s after her nine-year-old son, Walter Collins, went missing in 1928. During the trial testimony of Gordon Northcott, the state of California concluded that  Collins's son had been murdered in the Wineville Chicken Coop Murders, which were led by a man named Gordon Stewart Northcott, who was executed at San Quentin in 1930. Her search for the whereabouts of her son was the subject of the 2008 Clint Eastwood film Changeling, in which she was portrayed by Angelina Jolie.

Early life 
Christine Collins was born in 1888 as Christine Ida Dunne. She married Walter J. Collins, an ex-convict using an alias. Collins was born Walter Joseph Anson, and hid his past from her.  They had a son, Walter, in September, 1918.

Disappearance of Walter Collins
Collins' son disappeared on March 10, 1928, after she gave him money to go to the cinema. Walter's disappearance received nationwide attention, and the Los Angeles Police Department followed up on hundreds of leads without success. The police faced negative publicity and increasing public pressure to solve the case.  Then, five months after Walter's disappearance, a boy claiming to be Walter was found in DeKalb, Illinois. Letters and photographs were exchanged before Christine Collins paid for the boy to be brought to Los Angeles.

At the reunion, Collins said that the boy was not Walter. Under pressure to resolve the case, the officer in charge, Captain J.J. Jones, convinced her to "try the boy out" by taking him home. She returned three weeks later, again saying that he was not her son. Although she had dental records and backing from friends to prove her case, Collins said Jones accused her of being a bad mother and bringing ridicule to the police. Jones had Collins committed to the psychiatric ward at Los Angeles County Hospital under a "Code 12" internment – a term used to jail or commit someone who was deemed difficult or an inconvenience.

Jones questioned the boy, who admitted to being 12-year-old Arthur Hutchens, Jr., a runaway from Iowa. Hutchens was picked up by police in Illinois, and when asked if he was Walter Collins, he first said no, but then said yes. His motive for posing as Collins was to get to Hollywood so he could meet his favorite actor, Tom Mix. Collins was released ten days after Hutchens admitted that he was not her son and filed a lawsuit against the Los Angeles Police Department. Collins won a lawsuit against Jones and was awarded $10,800, which Jones never paid.

In 1929, Gordon Stewart Northcott was found guilty of abducting, molesting, and killing three young boys in what became known as the Wineville Chicken Coop murders. Northcott's mother, Sarah Louise Northcott, confessed in late 1928 to her participation in the murder of Walter Collins as being amongst her son's victims. Following her confession, she was sentenced without trial to life imprisonment for her role in Walter's death. The state chose not to prosecute Gordon Northcott for Walter's murder and instead brought him to trial for the murders of three other young boys for which there was also forensic evidence. On February 13, 1929, he was found guilty for all three murders and sentenced to death. Despite these convictions, Gordon Northcott denied killing Walter Collins, and Sarah Northcott later attempted to rescind her confession and gave other scattered and inconsistent statements. Collins, who chose to believe her son was still alive (in spite of the guilty plea entered by Sarah Northcott to a judge, and corroborating testimony by Sanford Clark, in the murder of Walter Collins), corresponded with Gordon Northcott and received permission to interview him shortly before his execution. Northcott pledged to explain the true account of her son's fate, but he recanted at the last minute and professed his innocence of any involvement. Collins was further encouraged by the appearance of another boy that Northcott had abducted and probably molested. The police initially thought the boy might have been a murder victim of Northcott's. Collins continued to search for her son for the rest of her life. Collins attempted several times to collect the money owed her by Jones, including a 1941 court case, in which she attempted to collect a $15,562 judgment in the Superior Court. She died in 1964 and was buried in Los Angeles.

Portrayal in media

 Changeling, a 2008 film directed by Clint Eastwood, depicts the events from the disappearance of Walter Collins in 1928 until the reappearance of one of Northcott's other victims in 1935. Christine Collins was portrayed by actress Angelina Jolie, who was nominated for the Academy Award for Best Actress for her performance. Eastwood stated Jolie was cast because she was a mother and had the physical look that would fit the time period, and Jolie said of her role, "The character reminded me a lot of my mom, so it was nice to play somebody who had the nuances of somebody I loved."
 The Big Imposter, the 06/07/1951 episode of the radio program Dragnet where a boy disappears in Los Angeles and is seemingly found about 9 months later in Dayton, Ohio when a runaway is caught by police and claims to be the missing boy from L.A.  The imposter is brought to L.A. and "reunited" with the missing boys' grandfather, but eventually the grandfather realizes the boy is not his grandson and the imposter admits the ruse under questioning by the police.  Four months later the body of the actual missing boy is found buried at a farm on the outskirts of Riverside, California, the victim of murder.

See also
Sante Kimes
List of solved missing person cases
Personation

Further reading
 Nothing Is Strange with You, James Jeffrey Paul 
 The Road Out of Hell, Flacco, Clark,

References

1888 births
1920s missing person cases
1964 deaths
Formerly missing people
History of Los Angeles
missing person cases in California
People from Los Angeles
History of women in California